Leah Cardamore Stokes  is a Canadian-American political scientist specializing in environmental policy. She is the Anton Vonk Associate Professor of Environmental Politics at the University of California, Santa Barbara. In addition, Stokes is a senior policy consultant at Evergreen Action and Rewiring America. She also hosts the climate change podcast A Matter of Degrees. Her research focuses on political behavior, public opinion, and the politics of energy and environmental policy in the United States.

Early life and education 
Stokes earned her undergraduate degree in psychology and East Asian studies at the University of Toronto. She completed a Master of Public Administration at Columbia University. After graduating, Stokes worked at Resources for the Future. She went on to work at the Parliament of Canada. Her role involved policy analysis for Members of Parliament working on the Environment and Sustainable Development Committee, and the Standing Committee on Indigenous and Northern Affairs. In 2010, Stokes moved to the Massachusetts Institute of Technology, where she earned a master's degree and a doctorate under the supervision of Lawrence Susskind. At MIT, Stokes created environmental policy curriculum, including The Mercury Game, a treaty negotiation that has been used by over 100 universities around the world.

Career 
In 2015, Stokes joined the faculty at the University of California, Santa Barbara. Her research focuses on energy policy and environmental policy in the United States. She has investigated the interaction between public opinion and policy making on renewable energy. She has also looked at how the design and presentation of  Renewable Portfolio Standards (RPS) changes public support for a particular policy. She has also published research on backlash against renewable energy projects. Her recent work examines Congressional staff and their understanding of public opinion.

Stokes is also a senior policy consultant at Evergreen Action and Rewiring America, where she focuses on federal policy advocacy to address climate change and accelerate electrification. In September 2021, she gave testimony on electrification to the Joint Economic Committee in Congress. Tina Smith, Senator for Minnesota, described Stokes as a "power­house contributor" to the passage of the Inflation Reduction Act of 2022, the largest investment into addressing climate change in United States history.

In October 2020, Stokes and Katharine Wilkinson started the podcast A Matter of Degrees, in which they discuss the levers of power that have created the climate problem and the tools to fix it.

Awards and honours 
 2018 Midwest Political Science Association Patrick J. Fett Award
 2019 Business and Politics (journal) David P. Baron Award
 2019 Jack Walker Award, Best Article on Political Organizations and Parties from APSA, 2019.
 2019 Information Technology and Innovation Foundation Scholar
 2020 Grist 50 Fixer
 2020 Harold J. Plous Award, UC Santa Barbara
 2020 Best Energy Book, “Short Circuiting Policy,” American Energy Society 
 2022 Business Insider Climate Action 30
 2022 Time 100 Next

Selected publications

References

External links 
 

Canadian emigrants to the United States
Canadian political scientists
Canadian women academics
Climate communication
Cornell University alumni
Living people
Massachusetts Institute of Technology alumni
University of California, Santa Barbara faculty
University of Toronto alumni
Women political scientists
Year of birth missing (living people)